The 2014 South American Rugby Championship B division tournament is held at the Estadio Santiago Rambay in Apartadó, Colombia over three match days during August and September 2014. The South American Rugby Championship is organized by the Confederación Sudamericana de Rugby (CONSUR).

Teams
 Colombia, Venezuela, and Peru all participated in the 2013 South American Rugby Championship B.
 Ecuador was promoted by winning the 2013 South American Rugby Championship C.
 After round 2 the top 2 teams will compete for a place in the CONSUR A playoffs against Chile.

Table

Number in brackets indicates the team's pre-tournament IRB ranking.

Matches

Round 1

Round 2

Round 3

See also
 South American Rugby Championship
 CONSUR B

References

2014
2014 rugby union tournaments for national teams
B
rugby union
rugby union
rugby union
rugby union
International rugby union competitions hosted by Colombia